The Holtet family, originating from Volstrup parish in Jutland, Denmark. A book, "The Holtet Family - A Family Genealogy" was written in 1932. Today, it is present on the Internet with a short translation into English. Also see the Danish Wiki about more exact details. Descendants have emigrated to the United States and Mexico.

External links 
 The Danish Wiki about Holtet
 The Holtet Family - A Family Genealogy
 Holtet's in the United States - Alexander Holtet

Surnames